Atbara Airport  is an airport serving Atbarah (or Atbara), a town located in the River Nile state in northeastern Sudan.

Facilities
It has one runway which measures .

References

External links
 

Airports in Sudan
River Nile (state)